7 Assassins is a 2013 Chinese-Hong Kong martial arts action film directed by Hung Yan-yan and starring an ensemble cast. Producer and star Eric Tsang states the film pays tribute to the Golden Generation of the movie industry.

Plot
Master Mao (Eric Tsang) is a warrior who had participated in the Boxer Rebellion. Mao is responsible for guarding Huang Jin Xia town, which have gathered many revolutionaries around China. There, they do not discuss about revolution nor care about politics and lead peaceful lives. Xilian (Gigi Leung), a woman who was rescued by Mao, is oblivious that years ago, Mao not only rescued her and her child, he also rescued her heart.

Revolutionary Tieyun (Felix Wong) and his like-minded comrades raid a desert and smuggle gold there, preparing to purchase firearms for another uprising. During their way, they were ambushed by Man Tianhong (Ni Hongjie), the Prince of Pok Yee Kak. During the critical moment, they were fortunately rescued by the sincere official Governor Zhuo (Ti Lung). Zhuo is visionary and believes that fate the country lies on Tieyun. Zhuo arranges for Tieyun to go to Huang Jin Xia to meet the heroic Master Mao. But with the arrival of Tieyun, Huang Jin Xia's peaceful environment was broken, and the retired revolutionaries once again display their heroism and fight for the dignity of the country.

Cast
Eric Tsang as Master Mao (貓老板)
Felix Wong as Tieyun (鐵雲)
Gigi Leung as Xilian (細簾)
Yoo Oh-seong as Wu Zhong-e (武忠額)
Guo Tao as Liu Aotian (柳傲天)
Ni Hongjie as Man Tianhong (滿天紅)
Rose Chan as Liu Xu (柳絮)
Ray Lui as The Prince (親王)
Max Mok as Chan Mu-bai (慕白)
Shaun Tam as Shigen (石根)
Power Chan as Xiaoye (小葉) (credited as Chan Kwok Pong)
Hung Yan-yan as Wuchou (無仇) a descendant from the Taiping Kingdom (credited as Xiong Xin Xin)
Well Lee as Anle (安樂)
Zhang En Ke as Enke
Zhang En Qi as Enqi
Du Tian Yu as Gou-er
Simon Yam as Laohu (老胡) a pawnshop owner
Kara Hui as Laohu's Wife (胡妻)
Ti Lung as Governor Zhuo (卓知府)
Waise Lee as Captain Wang (汪捕頭) under Governor Zhuo
Michael Wong as Peter Fang (方彼得)
Cheung Kwok-keung as Villager of Golden Valley
Cherie Chan as Villager of Golden Valley
Mars as Villager of Golden Valley
Ellen Chan as Madam Xishi (西施姐)
Ben Ng as Nam (阿南), a Revolutionist (義士)
Jason Lau as Revolutionist (義士)
Bryan Leung as Laochen (老陳), a biscuit seller (credited as Leung Ka Yan)
Chen Kuan-tai as Brother Tai (credited as Chan Koon Tai), a Revolutionist (義士)
Fung Hark-On as Brother Ke, a Revolutionist (義士), (credited as Fung Hak On)
Tony Liu as Revolutionist (credited as Antony Lau)
Lawrence Ng as Revolutionist (義士)
Song Xiaobao as Er Dangjia
Guo Jiu Long as Master Qi (七大爺)
Jiao Yang as Shigen's Wife
Dong Yi Wei as Governor Zhuo's Wife
Michael Tong as Tanglong (唐龍)
Dick Wei as Adjutant (副官) (credit as Tu Chi Lung)
Ken Lo as Adjutant (副官) (credited as Low Houi Kang)
Chang Di as Adjutant (副官)
Guo Yun Qiang as Adjutant (副官)
Edward Chui as Xiaoliuzi
Qin Tian Xuan as Jinfa
Hui Dong Qing as Villager
Choy Kwok Ping as Villager
Lv Jia Sheng as Villager
Hao Guo Dong as Governor Zhuo's Son

Theme song
"Glory Days" (光輝歲月)
Composer/Lyricist/Original singer: Wong Ka Kui
Singer: Eason Chan

References

External links

7 Assassins at Hong Kong Cinemagic

2013 films
2013 action films
Hong Kong action films
Chinese martial arts films
2010s Cantonese-language films
2010s Mandarin-language films
Films about revolutions
Films about revolutionaries
Films directed by Eric Tsang
Films set in 20th-century Qing dynasty
2013 martial arts films
2010s Hong Kong films